The 11th Ward is one of the 50 aldermanic wards with representation in the City Council of Chicago, Illinois. It is broken into 38 election precincts. Five Mayors of Chicago have come from this ward: Edward Joseph Kelly, Martin H. Kennelly, Richard J. Daley, Michael A. Bilandic and Richard M. Daley. 

The ward has had notable levels of political corruption. It is home to the headquarters of the so-called Daley machine and the 11th ward "...had by far the highest number of trucking firms benefitting from the City of Chicago's Hired Truck Program".

Aldermen
The current alderman for the 11th ward is Nicole Lee.

Previous aldermen include (but are not limited to):
 Patrick Daley Thompson who, in 2022 was sentenced to four months in federal prison.

 His conviction arose from a federal indictment for "five counts of filing false tax returns and two counts of lying to the FDIC".
James Balcer
Pat Huels, resigned due to conflicts of interest
Michael Anthony Bilandic
Matthew J. Danaher, indicted
Amos G. Throop
George Bell Swift
Lester L. Bond

Demographics
As of 2015, the demographics of the ward were:
Total Population: 51,497
White: 37.3 percent
Black: 4.77 percent
Hispanic: 23.08 percent
Asian: 34.05 percent.

References

Community areas of Chicago
City of Chicago Wards